Paulo Kunze (1943–2011) was a racing driver in Brazil.

References
Piloto brasileiro morre após acidente na Stock Paulista Paraná-Online 

1943 births
2011 deaths
People from Araraquara
Brazilian racing drivers
Sportspeople from São Paulo (state)